Robert Louis Ramazzotti (January 16, 1917 – February 15, 2000) was an American professional baseball player who appeared in 346 Major League Baseball games between  and  as an infielder and pinch hitter for the Brooklyn Dodgers and Chicago Cubs. He was born in Eleanora, Pennsylvania, and grew up in Altoona.

He was 23 years old when he entered Organized Baseball in the Brooklyn organization in 1940; then, after two minor league seasons and the outbreak of World War II, he joined the United States Army. Attaining the rank of staff sergeant, he was stationed in Europe as a member of the 71st Infantry Division. Ramazzotti missed four full baseball seasons, 1942 through 1945, due to his wartime service.

In 1946, he returned to baseball and spent the entire campaign on the Dodgers' MLB roster, playing in 62 games as a utility infielder for a Brooklyn team that finished in a dead heat for the National League pennant before falling to the eventual World Series champion St. Louis Cardinals in a tie-breaker series. Ramazzotti batted .208 in 133 plate appearances in his rookie season. 

He had two four-hit games, both in 1949, a year in which, ironically, he struggled badly at the plate, batting only .179 with 34 total hits in a Chicago uniform.

During his MLB career of all or part of seven seasons and 346 games, Bob Ramazzotti collected 196 safeties, with 22 doubles, nine triples, four home runs and 53 runs batted in; he batted .230 lifetime. Defensively, he started 99 games as a second baseman, 58 as a third baseman and 43 at shortstop.

After baseball, Ramazzotti returned to Altoona, where he worked in manufacturing and later operated a sandwich shop. He died there at age 83 in February 2000.

References

External links

 Society of American Baseball Research biography of Bob Ramazzotti

1917 births
2000 deaths
American expatriate baseball players in Cuba
Baseball players from Pennsylvania
Brooklyn Dodgers players
Chicago Cubs players
Durham Bulls players
Havana Sugar Kings players
Johnstown Johnnies players
Major League Baseball second basemen
Major League Baseball third basemen
St. Paul Saints (AA) players
Sportspeople from Altoona, Pennsylvania
United States Army personnel of World War II